American singer and songwriter Tweet has released three studio albums, one live album, one extended play, 13 singles (including four as a featured artist), two promotional singles, and 13 music videos.

Albums

Studio albums

Live albums

Extended plays

Singles

As lead artist

As featured artist

Promotional singles

Other charted songs

Guest appearances

Other credits

Music videos

Notes

References

External links
 
 
 

Discographies of American artists
Rhythm and blues discographies
Soul music discographies